Amauta papilionaris is a moth in the Castniidae family. It is found in Colombia, Venezuela, Peru, Bolivia, Ecuador and Panama.

The wingspan is about 103–135 mm. Adults are dark brown with a transverse yellowish band running parallel to the exterior margin on the forewings. There is a small, colon shaped, yellow spot on the discal area. There is a turquoise band on the hindwings which runs from the costal margin to the anal margin, without touching it.

Subspecies
Amauta papilionaris papilionaris (Colombia)
Amauta papilionaris amethystina (Houlbert, 1917) (Venezuela, Colombia, Panama)
Amauta papilionaris lionela Lamas, 1995 (Peru, Bolivia)
Amauta papilionaris velutina (Houlbert, 1917) (Ecuador)

References

Moths described in 1865
Castniidae